Darja Donga ( Royal Thief)  is a 1985 Telugu-language action thriller film, produced by R. Ramakrishnam Raju under the Sri Vijayalakshmi Arts banner and directed by Manivannan. It stars Suman and Vijayashanti ,  Sathyaraj as the main antagonist, Rajendra Prasad in a supporting role, with music composed by Ilaiyaraaja. The film was dubbed into Tamil as Marma Manithan.

Cast
Suman as Raja
Vijayashanti as Jayanthi
Sathyaraj as Harichandra Prasad
Rajendra Prasad as Prasad
Sarath Babu as Inspector Sarath
Sridhar as Sridhar
Manohar as Manohar
Deepa as Shyamala
Silk Smitha as item number
Anuradha as item number 
Varalakshmi as Mumtaz

Soundtrack

Music was composed by Ilaiyaraaja. Lyrics were written by Veturi. The music released on ECHO Audio Company.

References

1985 films
1985 action thriller films
Indian action thriller films
1980s Telugu-language films
1980s masala films
Films scored by Ilaiyaraaja
Films directed by Manivannan